Brian Bulless (4 September 1933 – 7 December 2016) was an English footballer who played as a wing half and spent his entire professional career with Hull City. He also served with the RAF.

Bulless made 326 appearances for the Tigers from 1952 to 1964 before being forced to retire through injury.

Bulless died on 7 December 2016 at the age of 83, leaving behind his three children and grandchildren.

References

1933 births
2016 deaths
Hull City A.F.C. players
English footballers
Association football wing halves